Ajax Hellas Youth Academy or Ajax Hellas for short was a football youth academy based in Corfu, Greece, from where the organization managed a total of 15 clubs throughout Greece and Cyprus. The academy was established in 2011 by Dutch footballing giants Ajax Amsterdam.

History
On 15 March 2011, the Dutch football club AFC Ajax opened their first youth academies outside of the Netherlands, when the team partnered up with George Kazianis and signing a five-year contract with All-Star Consultancy, to build a total of 15 youth academies throughout Greece and Cyprus. Based on the island of Corfu where the main facility Camp Ajax Hellas was situated, the academy was managed by Eddie van Schaik, who served as head coach and consultant, working to teach the Ajax footballing philosophy at the various training locations.

Academies
Teams and academies
 Ajax Aspropyrgou (Aspropyrgos)
 Ajax Rethymnou (Rethymno)
 Ajax Syrou (Syros)
 Ajax Larisas (Larissa)
 Ajax Peanias (Paiania)
 Ajax Katerinis (Katerini)
 Ajax Imathias (Imathia)
 Ajax Gianitson (Giannitsa)
 Ajax Iliou (Athens)
 Ajax Renti (Agios Ioannis Rentis)

Single-academies
 "Themistocles" schools

Competition history

Coaches and staff
President
 George Kazianis

Head coach
 Eddie van Schaik

Technical Director
 Arnold Mühren

Coordinator
 Lampros Lionas

Stadia
Stadium at Camp Ajax Hellas, Corfu, Greece

Notable former players
The goal of the Academy was to recruit Greek talents to the Ajax Youth Academy in Amsterdam.

  Dimitri Silvestridis was the first player to join the Ajax Youth Academy in Amsterdam via the Ajax Hellas Academy. He played for the B2 squad for one season, before returning to Greece and joining Panathinaikos F.C. instead.

See also
 Ajax Youth Academy

References

External links
Official site

Youth
2011 establishments in Greece
Football academies in Greece